Lorival Alves dos Santos (born 7 October 1959) is a Brazilian professional football coach and former player who most recently managed Brazilian club ASA de Arapiraca in the Campeonato Alagoano.

Club career
Santos began his playing career as a midfielder for Guapira. He went on to play for Paulista and América-MG.

Coaching career
Santos began his coaching career with Banespa's youth team in 1985 and later went on to coach their first team where he won the Troféu Cidade de São Paulo which was his first title as a manager. His second trophy came in 2000 when he led Corinthians Paulista B to the Copa Chivas title. He won his third honour in 2004, leading ADAP to the Campeonato do Interior Paranaense Série Ouro title. He coached Brazilian teams in various professional leagues in the late 2000s and early 2010s including coaching ADAP in the 2005 Campeonato Paranaense, Cascavel in the 2007 Campeonato Paranaense, Roma Apucarana in the 2008 Copa do Brasil, Central in the 2009 Campeonato Pernambucano, Canoas in the 2010 Campeonato Gaúcho and Treze in the 2013 Campeonato Paraibano.

After 28 years of coaching in Brazil, Santos took up a new job as he was appointed manager of Iraqi Premier League champions Al-Shorta. He coached them through their 2014 AFC Champions League qualifying campaign and their 2014 AFC Cup group stage campaign but the club was eliminated from both tournaments. Santos successfully led Al-Shorta to first place in the 2013–14 Iraqi Premier League with 43 points from 21 matches, although the season was ended prematurely due to the war situation in the country. He received a Certificate of Merit for achieving an unprecedented feat of most consecutive wins against the club's rival teams, as his team achieved seven wins from seven matches against Al-Zawraa, Duhok, Erbil, Al-Talaba, Al-Quwa Al-Jawiya and Amanat Baghdad until the streak was ended with a 2–2 draw against Duhok. He was the coach who gave Mohanad Ali his debut in the Baghdad Derby against Al-Talaba on 26 March 2014 which made Mohanad the youngest player in Al-Shorta's history at only 13 years old.

He then returned to coaching in Brazil and managed Cascavel in their first five 2019 Campeonato Paranaense matches, achieving two wins and three losses, before taking over at ASA de Arapiraca where he won the Copa Alagoas.

Honours

Manager
Banespa
Troféu Cidade de São Paulo: 1989

Corinthians B
Copa Chivas: 2000

ADAP
Campeonato do Interior Paranaense Série Ouro: 2004

ASA
Copa Alagoas: 2021

Individual
Copa Chivas Best Manager: 2000
Iraqi Premier League Certificate of Merit: 2014

References

External links

1959 births
Living people
Footballers from São Paulo
Brazilian footballers
Brazilian football managers
Association football midfielders
Paulista Futebol Clube players
América Futebol Clube (MG) players
Clube Atlético Juventus managers
Grêmio Barueri Futebol managers
Esporte Clube Taubaté managers
São Bernardo Futebol Clube managers
Centro Sportivo Alagoano managers
Central Sport Club managers
Canoas Sport Club managers
Sport Club Corinthians Alagoano managers
São José Esporte Clube managers
Treze Futebol Clube managers
Agremiação Sportiva Arapiraquense managers
Al-Shorta SC managers
Brazilian expatriate football managers